Domhnall I Earl of Mar - Domhnall mac Uilleim (Anglicized: Donald, William's son) - was the seventh known Mormaer of Mar, or Earl of Mar ruling from the death of his father, Uilleam of Mar, in 1276 until his own death somewhere between 1297 and 1302.   Excluding Gille Christ he is counted as sixth Mormaer or Earl of Mar.

In 1284 he joined with other Scottish noblemen who acknowledged Margaret of Norway as the heir to King Alexander III. Domhnall was later a strong supporter of the Bruce cause during the crisis of the late 13th century. He was at Norham in 1292, probably in the camp of Robert de Brus, then Earl of Carrick.

Family
Domhnall married Helen (sometimes called Ellen) the widow of Maol Choluim II, Earl of Fife, and possibly the natural daughter of Llywelyn the Great of Wales. By Helen, he had three sons and two daughters. 
 Gartnait,oldest son and successor, became the 8th Earl of Mar.
 Duncan of Mar
 Alexander of Mar, imprisoned in the Tower of London on 12 December 1297, along with Edward Baliol, son of King John.
 Isabella of Mar, married Robert I of Scotland as his 1st wife, mother of Marjorie Bruce who married Walter Stewart, 6th High Steward of Scotland. Marjorie was the mother of Robert II of Scotland the first king of Scotland from the Royal House of Stuart.
 Margaret of Mar (also called Marjory), married John of Strathbogie, 9th Earl of Atholl

The last record of Domhnall was in 1297, and the earliest record of his son Gartnait as Earl was in 1305, therefore, Domhnall died sometime between these two dates. However, a document dating to 1302, suggests that Domhnall had just died. The document contains terms of reconciliation between Edward I of England and Robert the Bruce, and stipulates that Robert should act as warden of Gartnait.

References

Sources
Rymer, Thomas,Foedera Conventiones, Literae et cuiuscunque generis Acta Publica inter Reges Angliae. London. 1745. (Latin)

External links
A Genealogy Webpage

1300s deaths
People from Aberdeenshire
13th-century mormaers
Year of birth unknown
Scottish people of the Wars of Scottish Independence
Mormaers of Mar